Añorga Kirol eta Kultur Elkartea (Spanish: Sociedad Deportiva y Cultural Añorga) is a Spanish sports and culture club from San Sebastián settled in the city's Añorga district. Founded in 1922, it comprises football, Basque pelota, basketball, mountaineering, chess, cyclotourism, and Basque folk dance sections.

Club history
The club is best known for its women's football team, established in 1980. Through the 1980s Añorga reached but lost the final of the national cup (until 1988, the only national championship) in 1984, 1987 and 1989. In 1990 it finally won the competition by beating RCD Espanyol 2–0 in the final. This marked the beginning of the team's golden era as Añorga became one of the two leading Spanish teams in the first half of the 1990s along with CD Oroquieta Villaverde, winning three national leagues and two more national cups until 1996.

However, the team declined through the next years. In 2001 Añorga the national federation invited Añorga to take part in the reunified Superliga which replaced the 48-teams, 4-groups + Final Four system held since 1997, but the club declined the offer due to financial reasons, so it was relegated to the second tier where it has played since. As the options to regain its former glory faded, the club supported the newly founded local powerhouse Real Sociedad, which soon made it into top-flight.

Titles
División de Honor (3)
 1992, 1995, 1996
Copa de la Reina
 1990, 1991, 1993

Season to season

Notable players

Former internationals
  Ángeles Arizeta
  Ainhoa Bakero
  Itziar Bakero
  Elixabete Capa
  Beatriz García
  Nahikari García
  Arantza Iradi
  Paula Kasares
  Arantza del Puerto
  Idoia Sarasa

References

External links
Añorga at Txapeldunak

Women's football clubs in Spain
Association football clubs established in 1980
Sports teams in San Sebastián
Football clubs in the Basque Country (autonomous community)